The 2023 San Luis Open Challenger is an upcoming professional tennis tournament to be played on outdoor clay courts. It will be the 28th edition of the tournament for the men which is part of the 2023 ATP Challenger Tour and 1st edition for the women which is part of the 2023 WTA 125 tournaments. It will take place at the Club Deportivo Potosino in San Luis Potosí, Mexico between 27 March and 9 April 2023.

Men's singles main-draw entrants

Seeds

 1 Rankings are as of 20 March 2023.

Other entrants
The following players received wildcards into the singles main draw:
  Rodrigo Pacheco Méndez
  
  

The following players received entry from the qualifying draw:

Women's singles main-draw entrants

Seeds

 1 Rankings are as of 20 March 2023.

Other entrants
The following players received wildcards into the singles main draw:
  Fernanda Contreras Gómez
  Maria Fernanda Navarro Oliva
  Marcela Zacarías
 

The following players received entry from the qualifying draw:

Women's doubles main-draw entrants

Seeds

 Rankings are as of March 20, 2023

Other entrants
The following pairs received wildcards into the doubles main draw: 
   /

Champions

Men's singles

Women's singles

Men's doubles

Women's doubles

References

External links 
 

2023 ATP Challenger Tour
2023 WTA 125 tournaments
2023
2023 in Mexican tennis